Fear Factor is a franchise that spanned from the original stunt/dare game TV show, Fear Factor.

It may also refer to:

Fear Factor (Yu-Gi-Oh! GX episode), an episode of Yu-Gi-Oh! GX

See also
 Fear Factory, an American rock/metal band